National Institute of Neurosciences & Hospital (NINS) is a state run tertiary care institute in Bangladesh focused on neurological disorders. It is located at Agargaon in Dhaka. Bangladeshi neurologist Prof Quazi Deen Mohammad is the founding director of this institute.

History 
The institute started its journey in September 2012.This Institute was inaugurated by Prime Minister Sheikh Hasina.

Administration 
Director of NINS is the administrative chief of the institute. He is assisted by Joint Director, Deputy Director, Assistant Directors (Admin, Finance & Store). Administrative officers assist them in this task.

Departments 

Department of Neurology
Department of Neurosurgery
Department of Pediatric Neurology
Department of Pediatric Neurosurgery
Department of Neurophysiology
Department of Neurointervention
Department of Neurorehabilitation (Physical Medicine)
Department of Neuro Radiology (Radiology & Imaging)
Department of Critical Care Medicine
Department of Cardiology
Department of Neuro-anesthesia
Department of Laboratory Services
    - Department of Neuropathology
    - Department of Biochemistry
    - Department of Microbiology
    - Department of Transfusion Medicine

Hospital facilities 
It's a 450-bed hospital. In its ten-storey building, it has six modern operation theaters, a 16-bed ICU, a 12-bed HDU, a six-bed Recovery Unit and a 12-bed post-operative rooms. The hospital is equipped with most modern radiology and imaging department. It has a 24x7 emergency unit.

Hospital Services 
There are a lot of Medical Technologist ,So 24x7 diagnostic services (Blood, urine, ECG, CT Scan Etc) are available.

Publications 
Journal of National Institute of Neurosciences Bangladesh is the official journal of NINS. It's launched in 2015 and publisbed biannually.

References

Medical research institutes in Bangladesh
Organisations based in Dhaka
Hospitals in Dhaka
Neuroscience organizations